Felipe Berchesi Pisano (born 12 April 1991, in Montevideo) is a Uruguayan rugby union player who plays as a fly-half. He currently plays for US Dax at the Fédérale 1 in France.

Club career
Berchesi started his career in Uruguay playing for Carrasco Polo Club. 

In mid 2013, he moved to Italy to play for Rugby Badia.

In mid 2014, he joined Fédérale 1 side Chambéry and after having an outstanding performance, he moved to Pro D2 side US Carcassonne.

International career
He has 39 caps for Uruguay since 2011, scoring 2 tries, 48 conversions, 76 penalties and 1 drop goal, 337 points on aggregate. He had his first cap at the 16-9 win Portugal, at 13 November 2011, in Caldas da Rainha, in a tour, aged 20 years old. He was called for the 2015 Rugby World Cup, playing in 3 games and scoring 5 penalties, 15 points on aggregate. He was called once again for the 2019 Rugby World Cup, playing in all the 4 games and scoring 6 conversions and 6 penalties, 30 points on aggregate.

In 2011 he played rugby sevens at the Pan American Games.

In 2013 Berchesi was part of Uruguay´s squad for the 2013 Rugby World Cup Sevens.

References

External links

1991 births
Living people
Uruguayan people of Italian descent
Rugby union fly-halves
Uruguayan rugby union players
US Dax players
Uruguay international rugby union players
Expatriate rugby union players in France
Rugby union players from Montevideo
US Carcassonne players